Raespa is a village in Lääneranna Parish, Pärnu County, in southwestern Estonia, on the coast of the Gulf of Riga. It has a population of 14 (as of 1 January 2011).

References

External links
Website of Saulepi region (Kulli, Maade, Matsi, Õhu, Rädi, Raespa, Saare, Saulepi and Vaiste villages) 

Villages in Pärnu County